The Edmonton air crash occurred on 4 September 1938. A Hawker Audax (serial number K7381) of No. 1 Elementary and Reserve Flying Training School, Royal Air Force, based at Hatfield, crashed into a residential area in Edmonton, Middlesex (now Greater London). The aircraft was being flown by a 19-year-old pilot, Sgt Stanley Robert Morris RAFVR. The pilot and 12 people on the ground were killed, including four children.

Accident
It is thought that Morris was attempting to land the aeroplane at Pymmes Park when it hit the roof of one house, fell into the roadway, and ended up on the roof of two houses on Dunholme Road, Edmonton, setting fire to the properties and killing the pilot and six of the occupants of the two houses. The 29 injured were taken to the North Middlesex Hospital, mostly with burns; 13 were detained in hospital, where five of them subsequently died.

Inquest and investigation
An inquest was held at North Middlesex Hospital on 7 September 1938, where evidence showed that the pilot was disobeying orders in flying over the area. An instructor at the Flying Training School said that Morris had been told to fly local circuits at Hatfield and should have stayed within three miles of the aerodrome. Edmonton was around 12 miles from Hatfield. The inquest heard that the aircraft had been fit to fly and had been flown by other pilots that day.  Morris had also been seen on the same day low-flying contrary to his orders. The coroner returned a verdict of accidental death to all the victims.

The Air Ministry released a report on the accident stating that Morris was operating contrary to orders; not only had he flown further than three miles from the aerodrome, he was also manoeuvring at low level over a built-up area. The investigation could find no evidence of a defect in the engine or aircraft.

Aftermath
Edward and James Letch, brothers who tried to rescue the pilot from the aircraft, died in hospital from burns. They were posthumously awarded the Order of the British Empire.

Memorial
In 2008 a memorial stone was laid at Dunholme Road Air Disaster Memorial in Church Street Cemetery on the seventieth anniversary of the crash.

References
Citations

Bibliography

"The Edmonton Accident" Flight, 15 September 1938 p240.

External links
 Movietone newsreel about the crash
 "Tragic Plane Crash at Edmonton" newsreel from British Pathé

E
Aviation accidents and incidents in 1938
E
1938 in London
Edmonton, London
1938 disasters in the United Kingdom
20th century in Middlesex
Disasters in Middlesex
History of the London Borough of Enfield